Ryan Suzuki (born May 28, 2001) is a Canadian professional ice hockey centre currently playing for the Chicago Wolves in the American Hockey League (AHL) as a prospect to the Carolina Hurricanes of the National Hockey League (NHL). He was drafted 28th overall by the Hurricanes in the first round of the 2019 NHL Entry Draft. He is the younger brother of Montreal Canadiens centre and team captain Nick Suzuki.

Playing career

Junior
Suzuki was drafted by the Barrie Colts of the Ontario Hockey League as the first overall selection in the 2017 OHL Priority Draft. On September 21, 2017, Suzuki made his Colts debut, as he scored a goal against Olivier Tremblay and added an assist in an 11–2 victory over the Ottawa 67's. On February 2, Suzuki had his first career multi-goal game, as he scored twice against the London Knights in an 8–4 win. On March 3, Suzuki recorded his first career three point game, as he scored two goals and an assist in a 7–2 win over the Niagara IceDogs. In the last game of the regular season, on March 17, Suzuki recorded five assists in a 10-3 win over the Sudbury Wolves. Overall, in 64 games with the Colts during the 2017–18 season, Suzuki scored 14 goals and 44 points in 64 games. On March 22, Suzuki appeared in his first career OHL post-season game, as he was held off the score sheet in a 6–2 loss to the Mississauga Steelheads. On March 29, in his fourth game of the playoffs, Suzuki earned his first career playoff point, assisting on a goal by Tyler Tucker in a 5–4 overtime victory over the Steelheads. On April 4, Suzuki scored his first career OHL playoff goal against Jeremy Helvig of the Kingston Frontenacs in a 6–5 Colts victory. In 12 playoff games, Suzuki scored a goal and four points, as Barrie lost to the Frontenacs in the Eastern Conference semi-finals. Suzuki was named to the OHL Second All-Rookie Team for the 2017–18 season.

In his second season with the Colts in 2018–19, Suzuki was named an assistant captain of the club. In the Colts first game of the season on September 20, Suzuki scored a goal and three points in a 9–2 win over the Owen Sound Attack. One week later, on September 27, Suzuki tied his career high with five points in a game, as he scored a goal and four assists in a 10–3 over the Sudbury Wolves. Suzuki had a very solid season, as he earned three or more points in a game eight times during the season. He finished the year as the scoring leader of the Colts with 25 goals and 75 points in 65 games. The rebuilding club failed to qualify for the post-season during the 2018–19 season.

Professional
Suzuki was drafted by the Carolina Hurricanes in the first round, 28th overall, at the 2019 NHL Entry Draft held in Vancouver, British Columbia. He was later signed to a three-year, entry-level contract with the Hurricanes on September 18, 2019.

Career statistics

Regular season and playoffs

International

Awards and honours

References

External links

2001 births
Living people
Barrie Colts players
Canadian ice hockey centres
Canadian sportspeople of Japanese descent
Carolina Hurricanes draft picks
Chicago Wolves players
Ice hockey people from Ontario
National Hockey League first-round draft picks
Sportspeople from London, Ontario
Saginaw Spirit players
Canadian people of Scottish descent
Canadian expatriate ice hockey players in the United States